"Every Morning" is a song by Swedish musician Basshunter from his fourth album, Bass Generation. The single was released on 21 September 2009.

Reception

Alex Miller from The Guardian said that "Every Morning" reminds McFly and criticized rhythms and lyrics. Miller also criticized the ending of music video. Alex Fletcher from Digital Spy said that despite the soft guitar jangle audible and some characteristics of the melody, it could be argued that "Every Morning" was a poor improvement over Now You're Gone – The Album. In conclusion he stated that because of the music video, lyrics and beats of the song "Every Morning" is an evolution rather than a revolution in Basshunter's development. Fletcher also noted that "Every Morning" is a little different from Basshunter usual style.

Music video
The video for "Every Morning" was filmed on location in Mallorca, and picks up where the smash "I Miss You" left off. Again starring with Aylar Lie, "Every Morning" sees Basshunter, Aylar and a group of their hot and vacuous young friends frolic happily on a boat in the Mediterranean as Basshunter tries to find the right moment to propose to Aylar, frequently thwarted by his friends frivolously wrestling him to the ground. However, when Aylar goes for a swim with her bikini-clad BFFs, they return screaming that she is lost at sea, to which Basshunter responds "where?!". The video ends on a cliffhanger, part of the continuing saga of the young lovers' troubled relationship.

Chart performance
"Every Morning" entered the UK Singles Chart at number 17 on 3 October 2009 and sold 12,876 copies in its first week on chart. "Every Morning" also reached number 17 on Irish singles chart on 1 October. On 11 September it debuted on Swedish singles chart at number 18 and peaked in its second week on chart at number 13. On New Zealand singles chart it debuted on 14 September 2009 at number 39 and returned two weeks later reaching peak on number 14 after its three weeks on chart.

Track listing
 CD maxi single (Jonas sleeve, 2009)
 "Every Morning" (Radio Edit) – 3:15
 "Every Morning" (Payami Remix) – 6:04
 "Every Morning" (Extended Version) – 4:29
 "Every Morning" (Michael Mind Remix) – 5:10
 "Every Morning" (Headhunters Extended Version) – 5:23
 "Every Morning" (Ultra DJ's Bass Mix) – 5:26
 "Every Morning" (Rain Dropz Remix) – 4:52
 "Every Morning" (Hot Pink Delorean Remix) – 7:02

 CD maxi single (Aylar sleeve, 21 September 2009)
 "Every Morning" (Radio Edit) – 3:18
 "Every Morning" (Extended Mix) – 4:30
 "Every Morning" (Raindrops! Remix) – 4:54
 "Every Morning" (Ultra DJs Bass Remix) – 4:28
 "Every Morning" (Michael Mind Remix) – 5:12
 "Every Morning" (Payami Remix) – 6:04

Charts

Certifications

Awards

References

External links
 

2009 singles
Basshunter songs
2009 songs
Songs written by Basshunter
Songs written by Scott Simons
Song recordings produced by Basshunter